The 1894 All-Ireland Senior Hurling Championship Final was the 7th All-Ireland Final and the culmination of the 1894 All-Ireland Senior Hurling Championship, an inter-county hurling tournament for the top teams in Ireland. The match was held at Clonturk Park, Dublin, on 24 March 1895 between Cork, represented by club side Blackrock, and Dublin, represented by club side Rapparees. The Leinster champions lost to their Munster opponents on a score line of 5-20 to 2-0.

This victory gave Cork a third All-Ireland title in-a-row.

Match details

1
All-Ireland Senior Hurling Championship Finals
Cork county hurling team matches
Dublin GAA matches
March 1895 sports events